Robert Gould Tharp (October 25, 1928 – May 30, 2003) was an American bishop. He was the second bishop of East Tennessee in the Episcopal Church from 1992 till 1999. Bishop Tharp Business and Technology Institute in Les Cayes, Haiti, is named for him.

Early life and education
Tharp was born on October 25, 1928, in Orlando, Florida. He studied at Wesleyan University and graduated with a Bachelor of Arts in 1950. He also served in the U.S. Army. Later he studied at the Seabury-Western Theological Seminary and graduated with a Master of Divinity in 1956.

Ordained ministry
Tharp was ordained deacon in 1956 and priest on January 9, 1957. In 1956 he became curate at St. Mary’s Church in Tampa, Florida, while on August 1, 1958, he became curate at St. Philip's Church in Coral Gables, Florida. Later he became rector of the Church of the Good Shepherd in Maitland, Florida, and then rector of St James' Church in Ormond Beach, Florida, a post he retained until 1968. In 1968 he took a sabbatical to study at King's College London in England. Upon his return to the United States in 1969, he become rector of St Peter’s Church in Columbia, Tennessee. In 1978 he left St. Peter's and became canon to the ordinary (assistant to the bishop) of the Diocese of Tennessee, a post he carried with him when Bishop Sanders of Tennessee became Bishop of East Tennessee in 1985.

Episcopacy
On November 17, 1990, Tharp was elected Coadjutor Bishop of East Tennessee during a special meeting of the sixth annual convention of the diocese. He was consecrated on May 4, 1991, by Presiding Bishop Edmond L. Browning. He succeeded as diocesan bishop on January 1, 1992, and retired in February 1999. After retirement he served as chairman of the board of directors for Episcopal Relief and Development and Assistant Bishop of Atlanta. Tharp died on May 30, 2003.

References

1928 births
2003 deaths
People from Orlando, Florida
Wesleyan University alumni
Seabury-Western Theological Seminary alumni
20th-century American Episcopalians
Episcopal bishops of East Tennessee
20th-century American clergy